Serine protease HTRA1 is an enzyme that in humans is encoded by the HTRA1 gene. The HTRA1 protein is composed of four distinct protein domains. They are from amino-terminus to carboxyl-terminus an Insulin-like growth factor binding domain, a kazal domain, a trypsin-like peptidase domain and a PDZ domain.

This gene encodes a member of the trypsin family of serine proteases. This protein is a secreted enzyme that is proposed to regulate the availability of insulin-like growth factors (IGFs) by cleaving IGF-binding proteins. It has also been suggested to be a regulator of cell growth.

Mutations of this gene are responsible for the development of CARASIL, a genetic form of cerebral vasculopathy.

References

External links
  GeneReviews/NCBI/NIH/UW entry on CARASIL Cerebral Autosomal Recessive Arteriopathy with Subcortical Infarcts and Leukoencephalopathy, Maeda Syndrome
  OMIM entries on CARASIL

Further reading